Joseph Kobla Wemakor is a Ghanaian freelance journalist, youth leader, Sustainable Development Goals advocate (the Convenor of Civil Society Organizations Youth Sub-Platform on SDGs in Ghana), a trained climate change proponent and human rights activist. He is also the Head of Media and Communications of the Ghana Chapter of the PLO Lumumba Foundation and the Public Relations Officer of the Greater Accra Regional Youth Network (GARYN). In the African Network of Young Leaders for Peace and Sustainable Development, he is the National Focus Person of the taskforce in Ghana. In line with his passion as a human rights advocate, he set up Human Rights Reporters Ghana. This is a non-governmental organization which seeks to end human rights abuse against women and children both within and out of Ghana.He has worked with the United Nations Information Centre, the United Nations Population Fund, and others.

Human Rights Reporters Ghana is a non-governmental organization whose aim is to rid society of discrimination and advocate for human rights, especially for women and children. The non-governmental organization embarked on a nationwide campaign to create awareness of the dangers of kidnapping, tramadol abuse and teenage pregnancy. Within two years, 60,000 people in three regions across Ghana benefited from the sensitization exercise.

Role in PLO Lumumba Foundation 
The PLO Lumumba Foundation is a Non Governmental Organization that was registered in 1990 as a company limited by guarantee. It was established by Patrick Loch Otieno Lumumba, a Kenyan lawyer and human rights advocate, with the objective of helping make the academic dreams of brilliant but needy students become a reality. Joseph Wemakor became the Deputy Head of Media and Communications of the Ghana chapter of the foundation in February 2019 and head in 2020.

Climate change advocacy 
In October 2019, he was part of 19 journalists who were selected from all over Africa to receive skills training and knowledge about climate change in Addis Ababa, Ethiopia. The training program was organized by the Climate and Development Knowledge Network (CDKN) in collaboration with the Inter-Governmental Panel on Climate Change (IPCC) and the Future Climate for Africa (FCFA).

Human rights promotion 
In July 2022 Human Rights Reporters Ghana investigated and exposed an abuse issue in Ampaame in the Ashanti Region of Ghana. A seven year old girl was beaten, tied up and starved, for stealing a biscuit according to witness accounts. Their publicity of the situation got public attention, which resulted in the intervention by authorities to rescue the girl.

Awards and recognition 
He was awarded for being the winner of the 2018 media competition on migration reporting. At the Ghana Institute of Journalism, he was the most influential media personnel during the first edition of the Campus Clique Awards in April 2016. In October 2019 he was awarded for a report he put together that gives insight into the Sustainable Development Goals (SDGs). This competition was in commemoration of the Ghana Institute of Journalism's 60th anniversary. In October 2020, he was featured in the international Business Woman Magazine based in Ukraine, with an update on upholding women's rights after the lockdown. The Human Rights Reporters Ghana (HHRG) was among the top 10 finalists for the 2020 Africans Rising Activism Award under the Movement of the Year category. He won the Honorary Award for Peace, Security & Education of  the Year at the maiden edition of the prestigious Africa Early Childhood Awards (AECEA) in 2021.

References 

Ghanaian journalists
Ghanaian human rights activists
Living people
Year of birth missing (living people)